The Criminal Records (Clean Slate) Act 2004 is an Act of Parliament in New Zealand administered by the Ministry of Justice. It allows for a criminal record to be hidden from the public if the person is eligible.

At the time the act was passed, the Ministry of Justice estimated that it may be applicable to 500,000 people (an eighth of the country's population at the time), the majority of which committed a minor offence in their youth. In 2015 it was reported that just over 220,000 people have had their convictions wiped since the Act was introduced in 2004.

Eligibility

In order to be eligible under the Act a person must have:
 no convictions within the last 7 years;
 never been sentenced to a custodial sentence (e.g. imprisonment, corrective training, borstal);
 never been ordered by a Court during a criminal case to be detained in a hospital due to his/her mental condition, instead of being sentenced;
 not been convicted of a "specified offence" (e.g. sexual offending against children and young people or the mentally impaired)
 paid in full any fine, reparation or costs ordered by the Court in a criminal case;
 never been indefinitely disqualified from driving under section 65 of the Land Transport Act 1998 or earlier equivalent provision.

In certain cases, a person cannot hide their past criminal record under the Act, such as when a person applies to work for the New Zealand Police or a job involving national security.

See also
Crimes Act 1961
New Zealand Police

References

External links
Criminal Records (Clean Slate) Act - text of the Act
Ministry of Justice - Criminal Records (Clean Slate) Act 2004

Statutes of New Zealand
2004 in New Zealand law
Criminal records